The Abbasiyyin Stadium is a multi-use all-seater stadium in Damascus, Syria, currently used mostly for football matches and serves as the home venue of the Syrian national team. The stadium which was built in 1976 is able to hold up to 30,000 spectators, being the 4th largest stadium in Syria.

History
The stadium was originally opened in 1957 with a capacity of 10,000 spectators, to host football matches and local athletics events.

On the occasion of the 5th Pan Arab Games in 1976, the stadium was entirely renovated and the capacity was expanded up to 40,000 spectators.

However, after the most recent renovation in March 2011, Abbasiyyin Stadium was turned into an all-seater stadium and the capacity was reduced to 30,000 seats.

Abbasiyyin Stadium hosted the 5th and 7th Pan Arab Games in 1976 and 1992 respectively as a main venue.

On 6 May 2001, a holy mass was conducted by Pope John Paul II in the Abbasiyyin Stadium.

References

Football venues in Syria
Buildings and structures in Damascus
Syria
Buildings and structures completed in 1957
Sports venues completed in 1957
1957 establishments in Syria